Sean Ackermann (born 6 June 1977) is a South African cricketer. He played in eight first-class and seventeen List A matches for Boland and Western Province from 1996/97 to 1999/00.

References

External links
 

1977 births
Living people
South African cricketers
Boland cricketers
Western Province cricketers
Cricketers from Cape Town